Cimic is an unincorporated community in Divernon Township, Sangamon County, Illinois, United States. Cimic is located on Illinois Route 104 west of its junction with Interstate 55; parts of the community have been annexed by Divernon.

Name
The original name of the town was Pawnee Junction. Cimic is a combined acronym of two railroad companies: Chicago and Illinois Midland—Illinois Central.

References

Unincorporated communities in Sangamon County, Illinois
Unincorporated communities in Illinois